L'Après-midi à Naples (Afternoon in Naples) is a painting by Paul Cézanne executed c. 1875.  The work is in the permanent collection of the National Gallery of Australia in Canberra.

The art dealer Ambroise Vollard related that the title for the painting "L'Apres Midi à Naples" was proposed to Cézanne by his friend the landscape painter Antoine Guillemet. There are two known preliminary sketches for the painting.

The work depicts a naked male-female couple in bed while a servant is seen arriving with a teapot. The painting's dramatis personae and arrangement of figures is said to have been influenced by the work of Eugène Delacroix. The fact that the afternoon is given over to carnality is said to signify that Italy was seen as a place of taking pleasure and Naples was most prominent on that map of indulgence.

The National Gallery of Australia also owns Lucian Freud's After Cézanne (2000) created by the later painter in response to this work.

See also
List of paintings by Paul Cézanne

References

1875 paintings
Nude art
Paintings by Paul Cézanne
Food and drink paintings
Collections of the National Gallery of Australia